The Padanian Declaration of Independence, fully: Declaration of independence and sovereignty of Padania (Dichiarazione di indipendenza e sovranità della Padania) was issued on 15 September 1996 in Venice by Umberto Bossi, leader of Lega Nord.

See also 
 Padanian independence
 Umberto Bossi
 Lega Nord

External links 
 Video of the declaration of independence

Lega Nord
Separatism in Italy
Declarations of independence
September 1996 events in Europe
1996 in Italy
1996 documents